German strongholds during World War II ( "fortresses") were towns and cities designated by Adolf Hitler as areas that were to be fortified and stocked with food and ammunition in order to hold out against Allied offensives. 

The fortress doctrine evolved towards the end of World War II, when the German leadership had not yet accepted defeat, but had begun to realize that drastic measures were required to forestall inevitable offensives on the Reich. The first such stronghold was Stalingrad.

Eastern Front Fortresses

On the Eastern Front, Warsaw, Budapest, Kolberg, Königsberg, Küstrin, Danzig and Breslau were some of the large cities selected as strongholds.

Western Front Fortresses

On the Western Front, Hitler declared eleven major ports as fortresses on 19 January 1944: IJmuiden, the Hook of Holland, Dunkirk, Boulogne-sur-Mer, Le Havre, Cherbourg, Saint-Malo, Brest, Lorient, Saint-Nazaire and the Gironde estuary. In February and March 1944 three more coastal areas were declared to be fortresses: the Channel Islands, Calais and La Rochelle.

Fate of the Fortresses

The fate of the fortress areas varied. Stalingrad, the first to fall, is seen as a crucial turning point in the war, and one of the key battles which led to German defeat. In several cases, Alderney, for example, the fortresses were bypassed by the attackers and did not fall, surrendering only after the unconditional surrender of Germany.

See also
 Atlantic Wall
 Festung Norwegen

Notes

References
 BBC article on Alderney
 Europe: A History, the history of Europe; page 1038

External links
 Festung Breslau/Fortress Wrocław

German
Siege warfare
Str
Military units and formations of World War II